National Highway 4 (NH 4) was a major National Highway before National Highway renumbering in Western and Southern India. NH 4 linked four of the 10 most populous Indian cities – Mumbai, Pune, Bangalore, and Chennai.

Route 
NH 4 constituted roughly 90% of the Golden Quadrilateral's Mumbai–Chennai segment. As a part of this project NH 4 has been widened from two-lane single carriageway to four-lane dual carriageway. The highway is known as Pune–Bangalore (PB) Road in some parts of Karnataka where it passes through. The Mumbai–Pune section of the highway was supplemented by the Mumbai–Pune Expressway in 2000. The NH 4 highway passes through highly populated towns and cities of Maharashtra, Karnataka, Tamil Nadu and Andhra Pradesh namely Pune, Satara, Karad, Sangli, Kolhapur, Belgaum, Dharwad, Hubli, Haveri, Ranibennur, Davanagere, Chitradurga, Tumkur, Bangalore, Kolar, Kanchipuram, and Sriperumbudur. The Bangalore-Chennai section of the highway is supplemented by the triangle of National Highways NH 7,  NH 46, and returns to NH 4 at Walajapet in Vellore district. In some areas, one side of the highway is made of concrete while the other side is of tar.
To overcome heavy traffic between Bangalore and Chennai the NHAI had planned to build the Bangalore–Chennai Expressway which allows vehicles to ply at a max speed 120kmph.It will start from Sriperumbudur in Tamil Nadu and terminate at Hosakote near Bangalore in Karnataka which is nearly 240 km.

The NH 4 by-passed Pune from Dehu Road to Katraj. The Pune bypass has 4 lanes. There is a partial service lane which cannot be called as motorable. Now, it is being widened by two more lanes, making it a 6-lane road from Dehu Road to Katraj since it is also used by the people of Pune as the city is growing on the other side of the highway too. NH 4 now also bypasses the busy Katraj ghat in Pune by a tunnel which saves almost one hour of travel on NH 4.

There are two exits for Sangli–Miraj twin cities on NH 4. Peth Naka exit is used by vehicles coming from Mumbai and Pune towards Sangli. Shiroli Naka exit is used by vehicles coming from Bangalore, Hubli, Belgaum and Kolhapur to reach Sangli. The proposed 4 lane Ratnagiri-Nagpur National Highway NH 204 meets National Highway NH 4 at Shiroli Naka about 35 km from Sangli.

Major towns and cities

Maharashtra:
Mumbai
Panvel
Pune
Satara
Karad
Sangli–Miraj - Two exits at  each
Ichalkaranji - 25 km from Kolhapur
Kolhapur

Karnataka:
Nipani
Sankeshwar
Belgaum
Hubli–Dharwad
Haveri
Ranebennur
Harihar
Davanagere
Chitradurga
Hiriyur
Sira
Tumkur
Bangalore
Kolar
Mulbagal
Andhra Pradesh
Palamaner
Bangarupalem
Chittoor
Tamil Nadu:
Ranipet
Walajapet
Kanchipuram
Sriperumbudur
Chennai

See also
National Highways Development Project
Mumbai–Pune Expressway
National Highways Authority of India

References

External links

NH 4 on Google Maps
Map of NH 4 from the National Highways Authority of India
NH 4 on MapsofIndia

4
4
4
4
4
Asian Highway Network
National highways in India (old numbering)